The King Khan & BBQ Show is a Canadian garage rock duo from Montreal, Quebec, Canada, who mix doo-wop and punk. The band is composed of former Spaceshits bandmates Mark Sultan and Blacksnake, alias King Khan. Mark Sultan, under the pseudonym BBQ, contributed vocals, guitar, tambourine, bass drum, and snare drum, while King Khan provides lead guitar and vocals. An entertainer named Leo Chips, formerly known as Age of Danger of the Deadly Snakes, (the SHOW in King Khan & BBQ Show) joined the group as a drummer and organist for some shows during the Invisible Girl U.S tour in 2009.

Although the duo originally broke up in 2010, in 2011 they announced they had started recording together again and discussed the possibility of several new albums. This was followed up with continued touring in 2012 and a return to normality for the band.

History
BBQ and King Khan had collaborated as members of the Montreal-based Spaceshits from 1995 until 1999. During a mid-1999 European tour, Blacksnake (as King Khan was then known) opted to remain in Germany. The Spaceshits, choosing not to continue without Blacksnake, disbanded. Later in 1999, Mark Sultan started another Montreal-based band, Les Sexareenos, before venturing off on his own in 2002 as a one-man band under the pseudonym BBQ. It was as BBQ that Mark Sultan re-established contact with Blacksnake, playing alongside Blacksnake's new band, King Khan & the Shrines. The two began writing songs together at Blacksnake's apartment in Germany, playing them live at sporadic shows around Germany and Spain.

In 2004, the band recorded their first album as the King Khan & BBQ Show, releasing "The King Khan & BBQ Show LP" in America on Goner Records, and on Hazelwood Records in Europe. The album was recorded by DM Bob in Hamburg, Germany. In support of the album, the band began a world tour, with stops in Europe, the US, and South America. In 2006 the band released their second LP, "What's for Dinner?", on In the Red Records.  In 2008, Impose Magazine crowned King Khan the best performer of 2008. On July 31, 2009, Pitchfork Media reported that King Khan & BBQ will be releasing Invisible Girl (Album) in November. They embarked on a forty-day US/Canada tour to coincide with the release. On November 12, while on tour in the United States, Khan, Sultan, Leo Chips and tour manager Kristin Klein were arrested in Kentucky on illegal drug possession charges. Klein was also booked for driving with an invalid license. She entered a guilty plea and will appear in court on April 2, 2010. The band missed three shows due to the holdup. The same year, the band brought their typically confrontational and wild show to China for a tour with local promoters Split Works.

In 2010, the duo was hand picked by Lou Reed and Laurie Anderson to play two shows at the Vivid Live festival they were curating. The shows were played at the Sydney Opera House. The festival described the band's art: "This dynamic duo has relentlessly pursued an uncompromising vision of the subversive power of music that pays no heed to commercial imperatives. Standing outside the industry, two fingers raised in salute, they have nevertheless managed to forge an international career completely on their own, idiosyncratic terms."
The band split after the Sydney show.

On June 2, 2011, Mark Sultan announced that he and King Khan had recorded with one another once again.

On July 13, 2012, The King Khan & BBQ Show reunited for the first time since the Sydney show, for a sold-out performance at Lee's Palace in Toronto.  They have continued to perform and tour, into 2019.

As of 2022, their single 'Love You So' from 2007 has gained renewed recognition thanks to being used in a number of TikTok videos.

Discography

Singles
 "BBQ & Blacksnake" 7" (Solid Sex Lovie Doll Records, 2005, SSLD 013)

EPs
 Animal Party 7" (Fat Possum Records, 2008)
 Teabag Party 7" (Crypt, 2008)
 We Are the Ocean 7" (Sultan Records, 2011)

Splits
 Split 7" with the Flakes (Norton Records, 2006, 9653)
 Merry Christmas From The Black Lips and The King Khan & BBQ Show 7" (Norton Records, 2007, 45–138)

Albums
 The King Khan & BBQ Show LP (Goner Records, 2004, 15Gone), (Hazelwood, 2005, HAZ 033), (In the Red, 2007, ITR147)
 What's for Dinner? (In the Red, 2006, ITR136)
 Invisible Girl (In The Red, 2009)
 Bad News Boys (In The Red, 2015)

DVDs
 Live!!! in Kansas City - Double Disc DVD (Twitch Productions/The Little Room Record Co., 2008)

References

External links
 Rollo & Grady Interview with King Khan - February 9, 2009
 Rollo & Grady Interview with Mark "BBQ" Sultan - October 9, 2009
 The King Khan & BBQ Show's Wild Feature in SPIN's February Issue
 The King Khan and BBQ show - Invisible Girl Video, 2010

Canadian punk rock groups
Garage punk groups
Musical groups from Montreal
Rock music duos
In the Red artists
Canadian musical duos
Canadian garage rock groups